Relocated may refer to:

Relocated (album), 2006 album by Camouflage
Red vs. Blue: Relocated, 2009 television miniseries 
"The Relocated", Inuit of the High Arctic relocation